XHEN-FM is a radio station on 100.3 FM in Torreón, Coahuila, Mexico. The station is owned by Grupo Imagen and carries its Imagen Radio news/talk format.

History
XHEN received its concession on August 31, 1990. It was awarded to the successors of Emilio Nassar Hamze, whose initials are enshrined in its callsign. Nassar had been the ex-president of CIRT, the Mexican National Chamber of the Radio and Television Industry, and so was his son, Emilio Nassar Rodríguez.

In 1997, XHEN was sold to Multimundo de Torreón, S.A. de C.V., and in 2006, most of Multimundo was acquired by Grupo Imagen, including its stations in Torreón, Querétaro and San Miguel de Allende.

References

External links
Imagen Radio Laguna Facebook

Radio stations in Coahuila
Radio stations established in 1990
1990 establishments in Mexico
Radio stations in the Comarca Lagunera
Grupo Imagen